Macellocerus is a genus of darkling beetles in the subfamily Tenebrioninae.

Species
Species within this genus include:

 Macellocerus acuminatus
 Macellocerus acutipenis
 Macellocerus ambalamanakanae
 Macellocerus ambiguus
 Macellocerus approximatus
 Macellocerus atroaenescens
 Macellocerus batesi
 Macellocerus connexus
 Macellocerus dimidiatus
 Macellocerus distinctus
 Macellocerus gibbipennis
 Macellocerus heterocerus
 Macellocerus klugi
 Macellocerus laticornis
 Macellocerus longicornis
 Macellocerus lucifugus
 Macellocerus lucifugus
 Macellocerus mucronatus
 Macellocerus opaculus
 Macellocerus pectoralis
 Macellocerus politipennis
 Macellocerus pulchripes
 Macellocerus puncticeps
 Macellocerus ruguliceps
 Macellocerus solieri
 Macellocerus specolae
 Macellocerus striatus
 Macellocerus tibialis
 Macellocerus violanü

References

Tenebrioninae
Tenebrionidae genera